Phitiwat Sukjitthammakul (born 1 February 1995) is a Thai professional footballer who plays as a defensive midfielder for Thai League 1 club BG Pathum United and the Thailand national team.

Career statistics

International

Honours

Club
Chiangrai United
 Thai League 1: 2019
 Thai FA Cup: 2017, 2018, 2020–21
 Thai League Cup: 2018
 Thailand Champions Cup: 2018, 2020

BG Pathum United
 Thailand Champions Cup: 2022

International
Thailand U-23
 Sea Games  Gold Medal: 2017
 Dubai Cup: 2017

Thailand
 AFF Championship: 2020

Individual
Thai League 1 Player of the Month: October 2019
Thai League 1 Player of the Year: 2019

References

External links
 

1995 births
Living people
Phitiwat Sukjitthammakul
Phitiwat Sukjitthammakul
Association football midfielders
Phitiwat Sukjitthammakul
Phitiwat Sukjitthammakul
Phitiwat Sukjitthammakul
Phitiwat Sukjitthammakul
Phitiwat Sukjitthammakul
Competitors at the 2017 Southeast Asian Games
Phitiwat Sukjitthammakul
Southeast Asian Games medalists in football
Footballers at the 2018 Asian Games
Phitiwat Sukjitthammakul
Phitiwat Sukjitthammakul